Dakoticancroidea is a superfamily of fossil crabs, containing six species in five genera, divided into two families. The family Dakoticancridae is only known from North American rocks of Late Cretaceous age, while the single species in the Ibericancridae was found in Spain.
Dakoticancridae Rathbun, 1917
Avitelmessus grapsoideus Rathbun, 1923
Dakoticancer australis Rathbun, 1926
Dakoticancer overana Rathbun, 1917
Seorsus wadei Bishop, 1988
Tetracarcinus subquadrata Weller, 1905
Ibericancridae Artal, Guinot, Van Bakel & Castillo, 2008
Ibericancer sanchoi Artal, Guinot, Van Bakel & Castillo, 2008

References

Dromiacea
Santonian first appearances
Maastrichtian extinctions
Taxa named by Mary J. Rathbun
Arthropod superfamilies